Sri Mulyani Indrawati (born 26 August 1962) is an Indonesian economist who has been Minister of Finance of Indonesia since 2016; previously she served in the same post from 2005 to 2010.  In June 2010 she was appointed as Managing Director of the World Bank Group and resigned as Minister of Finance. On July 27, 2016, Sri Mulyani was reappointed as Minister of Finance in a cabinet reshuffle by President Joko Widodo, replacing Bambang Brodjonegoro.

As finance minister from 2005 to 2010, Sri Mulyani was known as a tough reformist and was largely credited with strengthening Indonesia's economy, increasing investments and steering Southeast Asia's largest economy through the 2007–10 financial crisis. However, Sri Mulyani was widely criticized during the Bank Century scandal in 2008 when she supported the financial bail out of 6,7 trillion rupiah, and she was later summoned to the court as a witness in 2014.

In the same year, she was ranked as the 38th most powerful woman in the world by Forbes magazine.

Early life
Sri Mulyani was born in Tanjung Karang (now called Bandar Lampung) in Lampung, Sumatra, on August 26, 1962. She is the seventh child of university lecturers Prof. Satmoko and Retno .

She obtained her degree from the University of Indonesia in 1986.  Sri Mulyani received her master and doctorate in economics from the University of Illinois at Urbana-Champaign in 1992. In 2001, Mulyani left for Atlanta, Georgia, to serve as a consultant with the US Agency for International Development (USAID) for programs to strengthen Indonesia's autonomy. She also lectured on the Indonesian economy as a visiting professor at the Andrew Young School of Policy Studies at the Georgia State University. From 2002 to 2004 she was an executive director on the board of the International Monetary Fund representing 12 economies in Southeast Asia.

She is married to economist Tony Sumartono, with whom she has three children. She is a professional economist and has no political affiliation.

As finance minister
Sri Mulyani was selected as Indonesian Finance Minister in 2005 by President Susilo Bambang Yudhoyono. One of her first acts was to fire corrupt tax and custom officers in the department. She successfully tackled corruption and initiated reforms in Indonesia's tax and customs office and developed a reputation for integrity. She succeeded in increasing direct investment in Indonesia. In 2004, the year President Susilo Bambang Yudhoyono took office, Indonesia received $4.6 billion in foreign direct investment. The next year, it attracted $8.9 billion.

In 2006, just one year after selected, she was named Euromoney Finance Minister of the Year by Euromoney magazine.

During her tenure in 2007, Indonesia recorded 6.6% economic growth, its highest rate since the 1997 Asian financial crisis. However, growth is down in 2008 to 6% due to the global economic slowdown. In July 2008, Sri Mulyani Indrawati was inaugurated as the Coordinating Minister for the economy, replacing Boediono, who was to head Indonesia's central bank.

In August 2008, Mulyani was ranked by Forbes magazine as the 23rd most powerful woman in the world and the most powerful woman in Indonesia. During her tenure as Finance Minister, the country's foreign exchange reserves reached an all-time high of $50 billion. She oversaw a reduction in public debt to about 30% of gross domestic product from 60%, making it easier for Indonesia to sell debt to foreign institutional investors. She also revised incentive structures for civil servants in her ministry and began paying higher salaries to tax officials deemed to be "clean" so they would have less temptation to accept bribes.

In 2007 and 2008, Emerging Markets newspaper selected Sri Mulyani as Asia's Finance Minister of The Year.

After Susilo Bambang Yudhoyono was re-elected in 2009, she was re-appointed in her post of Finance Minister. In 2009 the Indonesian economy grew up by 4.5% while many parts of the world were in recession. Indonesia was one of just three major emerging economies to grow faster than 4% in 2009. The other two were China and India. Under her supervision, the government managed to increase the number of income taxpayers from 4.35 million in 2005 to nearly 16 million individuals in 2010, and tax receipts grew by around 20% each year to more than Rp 600 trillion in 2010.

In 2020, she made a controversy by releasing a global bond series with 50-year tenor, or the longest loan offered in Indonesian history.

In 2021, after the enactment of Presidential Decree No. 78/2021, she become one of Vice Heads of National Research and Innovation Agency Steering Committee, together with Suharso Monoarfa.

Alleged hacking by Australian intelligence

In November 2013, British newspaper The Guardian published articles based on leaks by the American whistleblower Edward Snowden that showed Australian intelligence had hacked into the mobile phones of top Indonesian leaders in 2009. This included Sri Mulyani, who at that time was the minister of finance. Australian Prime Minister Tony Abbott defended it by saying that the activities were not so much "spying" as "research" and that its intention would always be to use any information "for good".

Move to World Bank
On May 5, 2010 Mulyani was appointed as one of three Managing Directors of the World Bank Group. She replaced Juan Jose Daboub, who completed his four-year term June 30, overseeing 74 nations in Latin America, Caribbean, East Asia and Pacific, Middle East and North Africa.

Her resignation was viewed negatively and caused financial turmoil in Indonesia, with the stock exchange closing down 3.8% after the news, amid a broad selloff in Asia, while the Indonesian rupiah fell nearly 1% against the dollar. The drop in Indonesian stock exchange was the sharpest in 17 months. The move was described as "Indonesia's loss, and the World's gain".

There was widespread speculation that her resignation was due to political pressure, especially from powerful tycoon and chairman of Golkar Party, Aburizal Bakrie.
Bakrie was known to have enmity toward Mulyani due to her investigation into tax fraud in the Bakrie Group, her refusal to prop up Bakrie's coal interests using government funds, and her refusal to declare the Sidoarjo mud flow, which was caused by drilling by Bakrie's company, as a "natural disaster".

On May 20, President Susilo Bambang Yudhoyono named as her replacement Agus Martowardojo, CEO of Bank Mandiri, the largest bank in Indonesia.

In 2014, she was ranked as the 38th most powerful woman in the world by Forbes.

Bank Century Scandal

Right before her resignation, The Legislature, spearheaded by Golkar Party, accused Sri Mulyani of a crime with the bailout of medium scale Bank Century in 2008. Critics of the bailout claim it was done without legal authority and without proving a capital injection was needed to prevent a run on other banks, Bank Century bailout cost the state to suffer a financial lost amounting to 6.7 trillion rupiah ($710 million). Sri Mulyani has defended the bailout as necessary given the uncertainties in the global economy at the time and denied any wrongdoing.

However, criticism about Sri Mulyani's policy also came from ex vice president Jusuf Kalla. In his harshest comments yet on the controversial PT Bank Century bailout, former Vice President Jusuf Kalla denied claims by former Bank Indonesia officials that if the lender had been allowed to fail it would have had a systemic impact on the country's banking system and economy.

"The Bank Century scandal is a robbery, anyone who supports Bank Century, supports a robber." Kalla said.

Furthermore, all of the nine factions on the House of Representatives special committee agreed that there were suspicious and possibly fraudulent transactions during the bailout period beginning in November 2008 and evidence of money laundering. They all then said they lacked the expertise to do more and called on the Indonesian National Police (Polri) and Corruption Eradication Commission (KPK) to take over.

References

Additional reading

 Dadi Purnama Eksan. 2019. Sri Mulyani Indrawati: Putri Indonesia yang Mendunia [Sri Mulyani Indrawati: An International Woman from Indonesia], Jakarta: C-Kilk Media, .

External links 

|-

|-

|-

|-

|-

1962 births
Finance Ministers of Indonesia
Women government ministers of Indonesia
Indonesian economists
Indonesian Muslims
Living people
Javanese people
People from Lampung
People from Bandar Lampung
University of Illinois Urbana-Champaign alumni
University of Indonesia alumni
Female finance ministers
World Bank people
Working Cabinet (Joko Widodo)
Onward Indonesia Cabinet